Betty Blythe (born Elizabeth Blythe Slaughter; September 1, 1893 – April 7, 1972) was an American actress best known for her dramatic roles in exotic silent films such as The Queen of Sheba (1921).  She appeared in 63 silent films and 56 talkies over the course of her career.

Early life

She was born Elizabeth Blythe Slaughter in Los Angeles, where she attended Westlake School for Girls, and the University of Southern California. Betty had already shortened her name to Betty Blythe when she and three other women posed for a photo shoot of the newest swim fashion for women, a bathing suit.  Prior to then, women were expected to wear stockings with full dresses or  skirts into the water.

Career

Blythe began her stage work in such theatrical pieces as So Long Letty and The Peacock Princess. She worked in vaudeville as the "California Nightingale" singing songs such as "Love Tales from Hoffman".

In 1915, she had an unbilled part in Bella Donna for Famous Players Film Company.  After her first Vitagraph Studios role in the 1917 vehicle, she was given a leading role in the studio's 1918 film A Game With Fate.

As famous for her revealing costumes as for her dramatic skills, she became a star in such exotic films as The Queen of Sheba (1921) (in which she wore nothing above the waist except a string of beads), Chu-Chin-Chow (made in 1923; released by MGM in the US 1925) and She (1925). She was also seen to good advantage in less revealing films like Nomads of the North (1920) with Lon Chaney and In Hollywood with Potash and Perlmutter (1924), produced by Samuel Goldwyn.Other roles were as an opera star, unbilled in Garbo's The Mysterious Lady. She continued to work as a character actress. One of her last roles was a small uncredited role in a crowd scene in 1964's My Fair Lady.

Personal life
Blythe was married to the movie director Paul Scardon from 1919 until his death in 1954.  She reportedly made $3,500,000 when she sold a section of land that is now part of the Sunset Strip. She lost her fortune in the 1929 stock market crash. She died of a heart attack in Woodland Hills, California in 1972, aged 78. She is buried at Forest Lawn Memorial Park in Glendale, California.

Awards and memorials
For her contributions to the film industry, Betty Blythe has a motion pictures star on the Hollywood Walk of Fame located at 1708 Vine Street.

Her name lives on through the Betty Blythe Vintage Tea Room in West Kensington, London, England.

Gallery

Filmography

References

Further reading

External links

Betty Blythe at Virtual History

1893 births
1972 deaths
Actresses from Los Angeles
American film actresses
American silent film actresses
American stage actresses
American television actresses
Burials at Forest Lawn Memorial Park (Glendale)
Harvard-Westlake School alumni
University of Southern California alumni
20th-century American actresses
20th Century Studios contract players